is a Japanese professional baseball pitcher for the Chiba Lotte Marines of the Nippon Professional Baseball (NPB). He previously played for the Tohoku Rakuten Golden Eagles.

Career

References

External links

NPB stats

1996 births
Living people
Chiba Lotte Marines players
Japanese baseball players
Nippon Professional Baseball pitchers
People from Kurume
Baseball people from Fukuoka Prefecture
Tohoku Rakuten Golden Eagles players